Evans Creek is a tributary, about  long, of the Rogue River in the U.S. state of Oregon. It begins near Richter Mountain in the Cascade Range and flows generally south to The Meadows then southwest to Wimer then south to the city of Rogue River, all in Jackson County. Wimer Bridge, a one-lane covered bridge crosses the creek at Wimer.

Named tributaries from source to mouth are Railroad Gap, Wolf, Coal, Chapman, Canon, and Morrison creeks. Further downstream come Spignet, West Fork Evans, May, Sykes, and Pleasant creeks. Last are Bear Branch and Fielder Creek.

Formerly listed among the 10 worst dams in the state for migratory fish passage, two abandoned dams on Evans Creek were demolished in 2015.

See also
List of rivers of Oregon

References

Rivers of Oregon
Rivers of Jackson County, Oregon